MS Polarlys is a Hurtigruten vessel built by Ulstein Verft in Ulstein, Norway in 1996. It is named after the Aurora polaris and is the third Hurtigruten vessel to bear the name after this phenomenon.

References

External links 

Hurtigruten ASA Official homepage - MS Polarlys
 Hurtigruten-Web.com

Passenger ships of Norway
Ships built in Ulstein
1995 ships
Merchant ships of Norway
Hurtigruten